Margaret Courtenay may refer to:

 Margaret Courtenay, Marchioness of Namur, Countess of Vianden (d. 1270)
 Margaret Courtenay, Baroness Herbert (d. before 1526)
 Margaret Courtenay (actress), British actress (1923-1996)

See also
 Margaret (disambiguation)
 Courtenay (disambiguation)